Majors Stadium was a baseball field in Greenville, TX but was originally used as a football field. In the beginning, the field was called Phillips Field but was later altered to allow baseball to be played.

Phillips Field
Before Majors Stadium became a baseball diamond, it was used in the early years by local high school football teams. On October 4, 1929, Dallas Oak Cliff and Greenville High School played the first contest at the venue.

The field was transformed for the Greenville Majors after their first year of existence. In 1947, the football stands were removed and the stands were rebuilt to accommodate baseball.

Visit by the Yankees
The New York Yankees played the Greenville Majors on April 10, 1949, in an exhibition game. The Majors won the game, 4–3.

Remnants
The only parts left are the arched entryway and a fieldhouse where the field used to exist.

Sources

References

High school football venues in Texas
Baseball venues in Texas
Sports venues completed in 1929